Blagny is a commune in the Ardennes department in northern France. It is around 7 km from the Belgian border, and around 20 km south-east of Sedan.

Population

See also
Communes of the Ardennes department

References

Communes of Ardennes (department)
Ardennes communes articles needing translation from French Wikipedia